Stradivarius (Catalan: []) is a Spanish-French women's clothing fast fashion retailer from Barcelona owned by the Inditex group. As of 31 January 2022, Stradivarius is present with 915 stores in 62 countries.

History
Stradivarius was developed in 1994 by the Catalan Triquell family with an innovative concept for fashion in Barcelona, Spain. In 1999, Inditex purchased 90% of Stradivarius shares for €108 million and the remaining 10% in 2005, keeping Jordi Triquell, son of the founder, Francisco Triquell, as director.

One of the most characteristic symbols of the company is the treble clef which in the former logo is standing out for the substitution of the first "S" of the name for a treble clef, while for recent logos it is in  front of the name.

On 1 February 2017, it launched the first fashion line for men under "Stradivarius Man" label, although in 2018 they decided to close it due to low sales.

References

External links
Official website
 

Inditex brands
Companies based in Catalonia
Clothing companies established in 1994
Clothing brands of Spain
Clothing retailers of Spain
Retail companies established in 1994
1999 mergers and acquisitions